Giovanni Zamboni (fl. early 18th century, possibly 1664–1721) was a baroque composer.

Zamboni was an able musician who mastered theorbo, lute, guitar, mandola, mandoline and harpsichord. He was also skilled in counterpoint.

His works include (Sonate d'intavolatura di liuto Op. 1), a set of 11 Sonatas and a Ciaccona for the archlute published in 1718.

 

Italian Baroque composers
Italian male classical composers
18th-century Italian composers
18th-century Italian male musicians